Mauricio Romero may refer to:

 Mauricio Romero (Colombian footballer) (born 1979), Colombian football midfielder
 Mauricio Romero (Argentine footballer) (born 1983), Argentine football defender
 Mauricio Romero (Mexican footballer) (born 1983), Mexican football forward

es:Mauricio Romero